Harold LeBel (born June 22, 1962) is a Canadian former politician and convicted sex offender in Quebec, who was elected to the National Assembly of Quebec in the 2014 election. He represented the electoral district of Rimouski as a member of the Parti Québécois.

He was a candidate for the party three times previously, running in Rivière-du-Loup in the 1989 election and the 1994 election, and in Kamouraska-Témiscouata in the 2003 election.

On December 15, 2020, he was arrested following allegations of sexual assault against a former member of the National Assembly, dating back to 2017. He was released later that day, and subsequently expelled from the PQ caucus, pending further investigations.

LeBel was found guilty on November 23, 2022 of sexually assaulting a woman at his residence in 2017.

On January 26, 2023, at the courthouse of Rimouski, he was sentenced to eight months of imprisonment.

Electoral record

References

Parti Québécois MNAs
Living people
People from Rimouski
French Quebecers
Independent MNAs in Quebec
21st-century Canadian politicians
Year of birth missing (living people)